Geoffrey Kenneth Kinrade (born July 29, 1985) is a Canadian professional ice hockey player. He is currently an unrestricted free agent who most recently played under contract with Severstal Cherepovets of the Kontinental Hockey League (KHL). He is a previous member of the SC Bern team of the Swiss Nationaliga A, as well as for HC Plzeň 1929 of the Czech Extraliga and the Tampa Bay Lightning of the National Hockey League (NHL). Kinrade has played one game in the NHL. He has two brothers, one of whom is Mike Kinrade, the professional free-ride mountain biker.

Playing career
Born in Nelson, British Columbia, Kinrade played junior hockey with the Cowichan Valley Capitals of the British Columbia Hockey League. He then attended Michigan Tech until 2009. He played ten games with the Norfolk Admirals after his college season was over in 2009. He made his NHL debut on April 9, 2009 for Tampa against the Washington Capitals. On July 10, 2009 he signed a one-year, two-way contract with the Ottawa Senators. Kinrade played two seasons with Binghamton after that, capping his time in Binghamton with a Calder Cup championship in 2011.

After the 2010–11 season, Kinrade signed with HC Plzen 1929 of the Czech Extraliga. Mid-season he moved to SC Bern of the Swiss Nationaliga A. In December 2012, Kinrade was a member of Team Canada winning the Spengler Cup in Davos, Switzerland. At the end of the 2012-13 season, SC Bern won the Swiss National Championship.

On June 1, 2017, Kinrade continued his career in the KHL, signing a one-year deal with Chinese outfit, Kunlun Red Star. He made 26 appearances with Kunlun before he left the club in a trade to Torpedo Nizhny Novgorod on November 16, 2017.

As a free agent into the 2018–19 season, Kinrade belatedly signed a one-year contract to continue in the KHL with Severstal Cherepovets on December 27, 2018.

Career statistics

See also
List of players who played only one game in the NHL

References

External links

1985 births
Living people
Admiral Vladivostok players
HC Ambrì-Piotta players
SC Bern players
Binghamton Senators players
Cowichan Valley Capitals players
Ice hockey people from British Columbia
KHL Medveščak Zagreb players
HC Kunlun Red Star players
Michigan Tech Huskies men's ice hockey players
HC Neftekhimik Nizhnekamsk players
Norfolk Admirals players
People from Nelson, British Columbia
HC Plzeň players
Severstal Cherepovets players
Tampa Bay Lightning players
Torpedo Nizhny Novgorod players
Undrafted National Hockey League players
Canadian expatriate ice hockey players in the Czech Republic
Canadian expatriate ice hockey players in Croatia
Canadian expatriate ice hockey players in China
Canadian expatriate ice hockey players in Russia
Canadian expatriate ice hockey players in Switzerland
Canadian ice hockey defencemen
Canadian expatriate ice hockey players in the United States